I Love to Singa is a 1936 Warner Bros. Merrie Melodies animated cartoon directed by Tex Avery. The short was released on July 18, 1936.

Plot

I Love to Singa depicts the story of an owlet (singing voice of Jackie Morrow, speaking voice of Tommy Bond) who wants to sing jazz, instead of the classical music that his German-accented parents wish him to perform. The plot is a tribute to Al Jolson's film The Jazz Singer.

The owlet's disciplinarian violinist father, Professor Fritz Owl (voiced by Billy Bletcher), kicks him out of the family's home after catching him singing jazz instead of "Drink to Me Only with Thine Eyes" to the pump organ accompaniment of his mother (voiced by Martha Wentworth). While wandering, he encounters a radio amateur contest (clearly a takeoff of the Major Bowes Amateur Hour), hosted by "Jack Bunny" (a pun on Jack Benny and later used in Goofy Groceries, voiced by Tedd Pierce). Billing himself as "Owl Jolson" (a reference to Al Jolson), he performs and his parents, worried sick about him (his father now regrets throwing him out) hear him over the radio. They rush to the station.

Jack Bunny has decided Owl Jolson wins First Prize, but when the owlet sees his family watching him from outside the studio, he reverts to singing "Drink to Me Only with Thine Eyes". Jack Bunny is about to revoke the prize, but the family bursts through the studio and stops Jack Bunny from kicking their owlet of the studio, and so, Owl Jolson's father, finally having realized his son's potential, allows him to freely sing jazz, and so Jack Bunny gave Owl Jolson the prize and so on the owl family lived happily ever after.

Production notes
 The first owlet hatched sang the opening bars of "Chi mi frena in tal momento", from the opera Lucia di Lammermoor. (Papa Fritz compared him to the great opera singer Enrico Caruso.) Translated in Italian is "Who is holding me back at this time?"
 The second owlet to hatch played the beginning of "Träumerei" by Robert Schumann on the violin. (Papa Fritz compared him to the violinist Fritz Kreisler.)
 The third owlet, a flautist, played the first notes of "Spring Song" by Felix Mendelssohn from his work Songs Without Words.
 The fourth owlet emerges singing jazz, causing his mother to faint. Papa decides that "if he must sing, we will teach him to sing like we want him to". Owl Jolson sings (badly and off key, due to his loathing of classical music) "Drink to Me Only with Thine Eyes", the lyrics of which are Ben Jonson's 1616 poem "Song To Celia." Whenever Mama had to pause playing her pump organ to turn the sheet music page, Jolson managed to get in a few bars of "I Love to Singa". However, Papa Fritz came over and caught Jolson singing the latter.
 The first known reject in the contest played a few bars of "Listen to the Mocking Bird" on the harmonica.
 The blackbird in the blue jacket played a few bars of "Nola", composed by Felix Arndt, on the saxophone.
 The bird with the accordion briefly played "Turkey in the Straw".
 The dark, operatic bird sang a line from the silent film Laugh, Clown, Laugh, even though the lyrics to the theme song don't have those actual words (this version was later used in Yankee Doodle Daffy when Porky Pig opened the door and saw Daffy Duck dressed as the clown singing, then shut the door).
 The overweight bird (voiced by Bernice Hansen) got only a few notes of "I'm Forever Blowing Bubbles" sung before being rejected.
 The country bumpkin bird (voiced by Lou Fulton) stuttered through the first and almost all of the second verse of the nursery rhyme Simple Simon before voluntarily rejecting himself.

Reception
As with several early Warners cartoons, it is in a sense a music video designed to push a song from the Warners library. The song in question, "I Love to Singa", was first written by Harold Arlen and E.Y. Harburg for the 1936 Warner Bros. feature-length film The Singing Kid. It is performed three times in the film: first by Al Jolson and Cab Calloway, then by the Yacht Club Boys and Jolson, and finally again by Calloway and Jolson. During this period, it was customary for Warners to have their animation production partner, Leon Schlesinger Productions, make Merrie Melodies cartoons based upon songs from their features.

The cartoon has become a cult favorite, with a pervasive impact on popular culture. The short, one of the earliest Merrie Melodies produced in Technicolor's three-color process, is recognized as one of Avery's early masterpieces. Musicologist Daniel Goldmark writes, "I Love to Singa may be one of the most instantly endearing cartoons Warner Bros. ever created. The story combines two themes that are as popular then as they are now—a child breaking away from his parents and contesting chasing the 'rags-to-riches' promise of amateur shows." Animation historian Jerry Beck agrees, "While not as wacky as Tex Avery's later works, I Love to Singa is still the perfect metaphor for the changes this great director brought to the studio. Instead of following stuffy cartoon convention, Tex taught his peers to march to their own drummers."

Legacy
The May 7, 2013 episode of The Looney Tunes Show, "Gribbler's Quest", featured a Merrie Melodies segment in which Gossamer plays the piano and sings "I Love to Singa" (with new audio sung by Kwesi Boakye). This was one of two instances of the show's Merrie Melodies segment using a classic song rather than a new composition with the other instance being "Yellow Bird". However, the lyrics were changed to remove racist terms such as "mammy."

In the first episode of the American animated television series South Park, "Cartman Gets an Anal Probe", Cartman is hit by an alien beam, causing him to begin singing and dancing to "I Love to Singa".

Owl Jolson appears in several levels of the video game tie-in to Looney Tunes: Back in Action, singing "I Love to Singa" via archive audio. Bugs Bunny and Daffy Duck will comment upon Owl when they get close enough.

Home media
 VHS – Cartoon Moviestars Porky!
 LaserDisc – Cartoon Moviestars Daffy and Porky!
 VHS – The Golden Age of Looney Tunes
 LaserDisc – The Golden Age of Looney Tunes
 DVD – Happy Feet
 DVD – Looney Tunes Golden Collection: Volume 2
 Blu-ray/DVD – Looney Tunes Platinum Collection: Volume 1
 Blu-ray/DVD – The Jazz Singer

References

External links

 
 
 I Love to Singa (Blue Ribbon) on the Internet Archive

1936 songs
1936 short films
1930s color films
1936 animated films
1930s American animated films
American comedy short films
Films scored by Norman Spencer (composer)
Films directed by Tex Avery
Merrie Melodies short films
Films about owls
1930s English-language films
American animated short films
Animated films about birds
American musical comedy films
1939 musical comedy films